Söjtör is a village of approximately 1500 people located in Zala County, in western Hungary. It was the birthplace of Ferenc Deák, (1803–1876) a Hungarian statesman living in the 19th century who served as the Minister of Justice during the Hungarian Revolution of 1848, and is now known as "The Sage of the Country".

References

ertzwt6trr56s5r4yfs5r

Populated places in Zala County
farkas